Oaks is a village in Shropshire, England, southwest of Shrewsbury.

The manor of Oaks is identified before the Norman Conquest, probably held with the adjacent Pontesbury and Wrentnall.

Notes

External links

Villages in Shropshire